A hydraulic telegraph refers to two different semaphore systems involving the use of water-based mechanisms as a telegraph. The earliest one was developed in 4th-century BC Greece, while the other was developed in 19th-century AD Britain. The Greek system was deployed in combination with semaphoric fires, while the latter British system was operated purely by hydraulic fluid pressure.

Although both systems employed water in their sending and receiver            devices, their transmission media were completely different. The ancient Greek system transmitted its semaphoric information to the receiver visually, which limited its use to line-of-sight distances in good visibility weather conditions only. The 19th-century British system used water-filled pipes to effect changes to the water level in the receiver unit (similar to a transparent water-filled flexible tube used as a level indicator), thus limiting its range to the hydraulic pressure that could be generated at the transmitter's device. 

While the Greek device was extremely limited in the codes (and hence the information) it could convey, the British device was never deployed in operation other than for very short-distance demonstrations. Although the British device could be used in any visibility within its range of operation, it could not work in freezing temperatures without additional infrastructure to heat the pipes. This contributed to its impracticality.

Greek hydraulic semaphore system 

The ancient Greek design was described in the 4th century BC by Aeneas Tacticus and the 3rd century BC by the historian Polybius. According to Polybius, it was used during the First Punic War to send messages between Sicily and Carthage.

The system involved identical containers on separate hills, which are not connected to each other; each container would be filled with water, and a vertical rod floated within it. The rods were inscribed with various predetermined codes at various points along its height.

To send a message, the sending operator would use a torch to signal the receiving operator; once the two were synchronized, they would simultaneously open the spigots at the bottom of their containers. Water would drain out until the water level reached the desired code, at which point the sender would signal with his torch, and the operators would simultaneously close their spigots. Thus the length of time between the sender's torch signals could be correlated with specific predetermined codes and messages.

A contemporary description of the ancient telegraphic method was provided by Polybius. In The Histories, Polybius wrote:

British hydraulic semaphore system 

The British civil engineer Francis Whishaw, who later became a principal in the General Telegraph Company, publicized a hydraulic telegraph in 1838 but was unable to deploy it commercially. By applying pressure at a transmitter device connected to a water-filled pipe which travelled all the way to a similar receiver device, he was able to effect a change in the water level which would then indicate coded information to the receiver's operator.

The system was estimated to cost £200 per mile (1.6 km) and could convey a vocabulary of 12,000 words. The U.K.'s Mechanics Magazine in March 1838 described it as follows:

The article concluded speculatively that the "... hydraulic telegraph may supersede the semaphore and the galvanic telegraph".

See also 
 Byzantine beacon system
 Fryctoria
 Heliograph
 Optical communication
 Signal lamp

References

External links 

 Connected Earth

History of telecommunications
Telegraphy
Optical communications
Ancient Greek technology
Ancient Greek military terminology
Ancient Greek military equipment
Communications in Greece
Semaphore